The Man from Sundown is a 1939 American Western film directed by Sam Nelson and written by Paul Franklin. The film stars Charles Starrett, Iris Meredith, Richard Fiske, Jack Rockwell, Alan Bridge and Dick Botiller. The film was released on July 15, 1939, by Columbia Pictures.

Plot
Rancher Tom Kellogg gets killed right before testifying against a gang of outlaws, then Ranger Larry Whalen comes in and finds the location of the gang's hideout and along with Tom's sister Barbara leads some angry ranchers into the gang.

Cast          
Charles Starrett as Larry Whalen
Iris Meredith as Barbara Kellogg
Richard Fiske as Tom Kellogg
Jack Rockwell as Hank Austin
Alan Bridge as Slick Larson 
Dick Botiller as Rio Mason 
Ernie Adams as Shorty Bates
Bob Nolan as Bob
Pat Brady as Pat
Robert Fiske as Captain Prescott
Edward Peil Sr. as Sheriff Wiley
Clem Horton as Bat
Forrest Dillon as Kirk
Edmund Cobb as Roper
Tim Spencer as Tim
Hugh Farr as Hugh 
Karl Farr as Guitar Player
Lloyd Perryman as Lloyd

References

External links
 

1939 films
American Western (genre) films
1939 Western (genre) films
Columbia Pictures films
Films directed by Sam Nelson
American black-and-white films
1930s English-language films
1930s American films